Rock Harbor is an unincorporated community in Monroe County, Florida, United States, located in the upper Florida Keys on Key Largo on US 1 (the Overseas Highway) northeast of Thompson and southwest of the census-designated place of Key Largo.

Geography

References

External links
History of Rock Harbor
History of Key Largo

Unincorporated communities in Monroe County, Florida
Unincorporated communities in Florida
Populated coastal places in Florida on the Atlantic Ocean